Palm V is a personal digital assistant (PDA) by 3Com.

Released in 1999 by 3Com, the PDA has an aluminum enclosure containing a Dragonball EZ central processing unit (capable of overclocking to 39 MHz) and 2MB of memory.  The 16-shade grayscale display has a backlight and increased resolution from the previous-generation Palm III.  Unlike that older device, which uses disposable batteries (AAAs), the Palm V has a built-in rechargeable lithium-ion battery with an expected charge lasting 1–2 weeks.  Palm Vs are equipped with a serial port that is electrically though not physically compatible with the EIA-232-D telecommunications standard (the new enclosure design prevents Palm III-compatible accessories from connecting to the port) and a Consumer IR transceiver.

Units sold in late 1999 came pre-loaded with Palm OS version 3.0, though 3.3 was available to download and install. The IBM WorkPad c3 is the Palm V, relabeled.

Ars Technica Will Smith raved about his Palm V in 1999, recommending it to all interested, excepting Palm III users for whom the technical-specifications upgrade wasn't substantial enough.  Writing for TechRepublic in January 2000, Jeff Thompson was enthusiastically full of praise for the Palm V, both for personal and enterprise uses.

See also

References

External links
 
 Press Release: 3Com Unveils the Palm V and Palm IIIx Connected Organizers

68k-based mobile devices
Palm OS devices
Palm, Inc.